Gnathifera pseudaphronesa is a moth in the family Epermeniidae. It was described by Reinhard Gaedike in 1972. It is found in Australia, where it has been recorded from New South Wales.

References

Epermeniidae
Moths described in 1972
Moths of Australia